Santa Teresa a Chiaia is a Baroque church in Naples, Italy.

The church was founded in 1620, and completed in 1650-1662 by Cosimo Fanzago. The earthquake of 1688 damaged the church and required reconstruction. The church was originally called Santa Teresa Plaggie, due to the place near the beach where it was located.  The facade is rich in stucco decoration. The interior is a Greek cross plan with a statue of  St Teresa, by Fanzago on the main altar. The principal works in the church are the Infancy of Mary, Repose in Egypt, St Peter appears to St Teresa and St Peter of Alcantara providing confession to St Teresa, by Luca Giordano.

Bibliography
Napoli e dintorni, Touring club Italia, Touring Editor, 2001.

External links

Roman Catholic churches in Naples
17th-century Roman Catholic church buildings in Italy
Baroque architecture in Naples